Al-Rai Subdistrict  is a subdistrict of al-Bab District in northern Aleppo Governorate, northwestern Syria. Administrative centre is al-Rai. At the 2004 census, the subdistrict had a population of 15,378.

Neighbouring subdistricts are al-Bab Subdistrict (southwest) and Arima Subdistrict (southeast), both in al-Bab District, as well as Akhtarin Subdistrict (west) in Azaz District, and Ghandoura Subdistrict (east) belonging to Jarabulus District. To the north is the Kilis Province of Turkey.

Cities, towns and villages

References 

Al-Bab District
Rai